Kermia apicalis is a species of sea snail, a marine gastropod mollusk in the family Raphitomidae.

Description
The length of the shell attains 9 mm.

Distribution
This marine species occurs off New Caledonia.

References

  Souverbie, M. (1861) Descriptions d'espèces nouvelles de l'Archipel Calédonien. Journal de Conchyliologie, 9, 271–284, pl. 11.
 Severns, M. (2011). Shells of the Hawaiian Islands - The Sea Shells. Conchbooks, Hackenheim. 564 pp

External links
 
 Kilburn, R. N. (2009). Genus Kermia (Mollusca: Gastropoda: Conoidea: Conidae: Raphitominae) in South African Waters, with Observations on the Identities of Related Extralimital Species. African Invertebrates. 50(2): 217-236
 Gastropods.com: Kermia apicalis
 MNHN, Paris: syntype

apicalis
Gastropods described in 1861